Miguel Duarte (born 1 December 1966) is a Portuguese equestrian. He competed in two events at the 2008 Summer Olympics.

References

External links
 

1966 births
Living people
Portuguese male equestrians
Portuguese dressage riders
Olympic equestrians of Portugal
Equestrians at the 2008 Summer Olympics
Sportspeople from Lisbon